Enderleinella is a genus of insects belonging to the family Stenopsocidae.

The species of this genus are found in Europe and Australia.

Species 
 Enderleinella anocella Li & Fasheng, 1999 
 Enderleinella aureola Li & Fasheng, 2002 
 Enderleinella obsoleta (Stephens, 1836)

References

Stenopsocidae
Psocoptera genera